Oliver "Ollie" Goethe (alternatively spelt Gøthe or Göthe, born 14 October 2004) is a Danish-German racing driver based in Monaco, currently competing in the 2023 FIA Formula 3 Championship with Trident. He is the current champion of the Euroformula Open Championship by winning eleven races in his winning campaign and he also competed as a replacement driver during the 2022 FIA Formula 3 Championship for Campos Racing.

Early life 
Goethe was educated at Millfield School along with his older brother, Benjamin.

Career

Karting 
Goethe made his international karting debut in 2019, where he raced in both the European and World Championships in the OK-category, both of which he failed to finish. The Dane then competed in the WSK Super Master Series and WSK Champions Cup in 2020.

Lower formulae 
In 2019, Goethe made his first single-seater appearance, driving for Drivex School in the final round of the F4 Spanish Championship.

He then raced in the series full-time in the 2020 season, this time with MP Motorsport. Being only 15 years old during most of the season, Goethe achieved six podiums, including a win at the Circuit Paul Ricard. He placed fifth in the rookies' and overall championships respectively at the end of the year.

Formula Regional European Championship 

Goethe progressed into the Formula Regional European Championship in 2021, partnering Franco Colapinto and fellow F4 graduate Kas Haverkort at MP Motorsport. He scored his first points in the second race of the first round at Imola, finishing ninth in race two. Goethe's only other points finish came at the second race at Zandvoort, where he ended up in tenth place, and the Dane came 23rd in the overall standings, twelfth-highest of all rookies.

Euroformula Open 
For 2022, Goethe switched to the Euroformula Open, partnering with Motopark. At the first round at Estoril, the Dane qualified on pole for the first race, but lost multiple places at the start after a slow getaway, although he would recover to finish third later on. He would have another bad start in Race 2, but would fight back to win the race despite a five-second penalty. Continuing his season in similar fashion, Goethe qualified first for both races at the Pau Circuit, taking a win in Race 1 but losing out on the Grand Prix victory on Sunday to Vladislav Lomko and teammate Christian Mansell. He would have a dominant weekend at Le Castellet, winning two of the three races and coming just short in Race 2 to Mansell. Goethe continued his winning streak, taking victory in all three races at the Circuit de Spa-Francorchamps, despite starting the latter pair of races from sixth. At the final round before the summer break, Goethe once again won the opening race and ended his weekend with another podium in Race 3. Following the first half of the season, he remarked that leading the championship "helps the nerves for when I am in future categories". Two more wins at Imola and the Red Bull Ring followed before a disappointing round at Monza, where he encountered a spin in Race 1 and a brake disc failure before Race 2, which prevented him from starting from pole. Undeterred by this, Goethe clinched the title at the final round in Barcelona by winning the first race, finishing the season with eleven wins and a total of 18 podiums.

FIA Formula 3 Championship

2022 
After Hunter Yeany sustained a broken wrist in the Austrian round, Goethe was drafted to replace him for the Hungary round at Campos Racing. In qualifying, he ended up besting his teammates David Vidales and Pepe Martí, ending up twelfth, thus starting the sprint race from pole position. He dropped from pole position at the start but remained in the top ten throughout the race, ending in eighth after a last-lap collision between Arthur Leclerc and Jak Crawford, giving him three points on his debut. For the Spa-Francorchamps round, he was retained and once again bested his teammates in qualifying, securing a brilliant fourth position. In the sprint race, Goethe collided heavily with Zane Maloney, but luckily both escaped injury. In the feature race, Goethe's race was highly successful even leading the race at one point. He eventually finished fourth, after being passed by Oliver Bearman on the final lap. Goethe returned to his main campaign in the Euroformula Open for the final two rounds of the season and was replaced by Sebastián Montoya. Goethe ended the championship 19th with 15 points.

2023 
At the end of September 2022, Goethe partook in the FIA Formula 3 post-season test with Trident on all three days. On 2 December 2022, it was announced that Trident signed Goethe on a full-time basis for the upcoming 2023 FIA Formula 3 Championship alongside Gabriel Bortoleto and Leonardo Fornaroli.

Personal life 
Goethe's father, Roald Goethe, is a racing driver currently competing in the GT World Challenge Europe Sprint Cup. He is also related to the German writer Johann Wolfgang von Goethe.

Karting record

Karting career summary

Complete Karting World Championship results

Racing record

Racing career summary 

† As Goethe was a guest driver, he was ineligible to score points.
* Season still in progress.

Complete F4 Spanish Championship results 
(key) (Races in bold indicate pole position) (Races in italics indicate fastest lap)

Complete Formula Regional European Championship results 
(key) (Races in bold indicate pole position) (Races in italics indicate fastest lap)

Complete Formula Regional Asian Championship results
(key) (Races in bold indicate pole position) (Races in italics indicate the fastest lap of top ten finishers)

Complete Euroformula Open Championship results 
(key) (Races in bold indicate pole position) (Races in italics indicate fastest lap)

Complete FIA Formula 3 Championship results 
(key) (Races in bold indicate pole position; races in italics indicate points for the fastest lap of top ten finishers)

References

External links 
 
 

2004 births
Living people
Danish racing drivers
German racing drivers
Danish people of German descent
German people of Danish descent
Spanish F4 Championship drivers
Formula Regional European Championship drivers
Formula Regional Asian Championship drivers
MP Motorsport drivers
Euroformula Open Championship drivers
24H Series drivers
Drivex drivers
R-ace GP drivers
Motopark Academy drivers
FIA Formula 3 Championship drivers
Campos Racing drivers
Karting World Championship drivers
Trident Racing drivers
People educated at Millfield